Janet Maw (born 16 May 1954) is an English actress.

She was a member of the BBC's Radio Drama Company.

Career

Television
 The Mayor of Casterbridge, 1978, BBC TV mini-series 7 episodes
Richard II, (TV film, 1978)
 The Barchester Chronicles, 1982, BBC TV mini-series 7 episodes
 Sparrow
 The Cater Street Hangman (TV film, 1998)

References

1954 births
English television actresses
Living people